This is a list of gliders/sailplanes of the world, (this reference lists all gliders with references, where available) 
Note: Any aircraft can glide for a short time, but gliders are designed to glide for longer.

H

Haefli-Lergier
(A. Haefli & L. Lergier)
 Thuner-Gleiter

Hafner-Rath
(Raoul Hafner & Josef Rath)
 Hafner-Rath HR-1 Gelse

Hagiwara 
(Hagiwara Kakkuki Seisakusho - Hagiwara Glider Co.)
 Horikawa H-22
 Horikawa H-23 
 Horikawa H-32

Haig
(Larry Haig)
 Haig Minibat

HAL
(Hindustan Aeronautics Limited)
 HAL G-1 – Hindustan Aeronautics Limited – India
 HAL X-241 (HF-24 glider)

Hall 
(Stan Hall)
 Hall Cherokee II
 Hall Cherokee RM
 Hall-Leonard Annebula
 Hall Ibex
 Hall Vector I

Haller
(Oldřich Haller)
 Haller ZA-2

Halloran-Wedd
(Clyde Halloran & William G. Wedd)
 Halloran-Wedd Mayfly

Hamburg
(Flugt. Vereins Hamburg)
 Hamburg Störtebecker

Handasyde
(Handasyde Aircraft Company, United Kingdom)
(G.A. Handasyde, F. P. Raynham, & Sydney Camm,  – Air Navigation Co, Addlestone, Vhertsey, Surrey)
 Handasyde 1922 glider

Handcock
(William Arthur Handcock)
 Handcock 1930 glider

Handley Page
(Frederick Handley Page)
 Handley Page 1909 glider

Hänle
(Ursula Hänle / Doktor Fiberglas)
 Hänle H-101 Salto
 Hänle H-111 Hippie
 Hänle H-121 Globetrotter

Hannover
(Hannoversche Waggonfabrik A.G)
 Hannover H 1 Vampyr – built by Hannoversche Waggonfabrik (HaWa) – a.k.a. HaWa Vampyr
 Hannover H 2 Greif – built by Hannoversche Waggonfabrik A.G., Hannover
 Hannover H 3
 Hannover H 4
 Hannover H 5
 Hannover H 6 Pelikan – built by Hannoversche Waggonfabrik A.G., Hannover
 Hannover H 7
 Hannover H 8 Phönix

Harbich
(Leopold Harbich)
 Harbich Ha-12/ 49 developed from SG-38

Harth-Messerschmitt
(Friedrich Harth & Willy Messerschmitt)
 Harth S-1 (Friedrich Harth)
 Harth-Messerschmitt S-03
 Harth-Messerschmitt S-04
 Harth-Messerschmitt S-05
 Harth-Messerschmitt S-06
 Harth-Messerschmitt S-07
 Harth-Messerschmitt S-08
 Harth-Messerschmitt S-09

Harth-Messerschmitt
(1922–25)
 Harth-Messerschmitt S-10
 Harth-Messerschmitt S-11
 Harth-Messerschmitt S-12

Hatherleigh
 Hatherleigh CAVOK

Hatry
(Julius Hatry)
 Hatry Wasserratte

Haufe
(Walter Haufe)
 Haufe HA-G-1 Buggie
 Haufe HA-S-2 Hobby
 Haufe HA-S-3 Hobby
 Haufe Dale Hawk 2 Walter Haufe & Leland Hanselman

Haufe
(Walter Haufe)
 Haufe Buzzer
 Haufe Buzzer 2
 Haufe Dale Hawk 2

Havrda
 Havrda SH-2H

Hawkridge
(Hawkridge Aircraft Ltd.)
 Hawkridge Dagling
 Hawkridge TM-2
 Hawkridge Grunau Baby
 Hawkridge Kittiwake
 Hawkridge Venture

HB
(HB Aircraft Industries Luftfahrzeug AG)
 HB-23/2400 Hobbyliner
 HB-23/2400 Scanliner

Heath
 Heath Super Soarer

Heinkel
(Heinkel Flugzeugwerke / Ernst Heinkel A.G.)
 Heinkel He 162S
 Heinkel Greif II
 Heinkel Speyer

Hemminger
(lennart Hemminger)
 Hemminger LH-22 Baby-Falk

Hendrikson
(C.J. Hendrikson)
 Hendrikson 1908 glider

Hentzens
(F. Hentzens)
 Hentzens Maikäfer

Hermanspann
(Fred Hermanspann & Art Penz)
 Hermanspann Chinook
 Hermanspann Chinook S

Herring
(Otto Lilienthal, Octave Chanute & Augustus Moore Herring)
 Herring 1896 glider - Otto Lilienthal, Octave Chanute & Augustus Moore Herring
 Herring Powered Biplane glider - Augustus Moore HERRING
 Herring Triplan 1896 glider - Octave Chanute & Augustus Moore Herring
 Herring-Arnot 1897 glider - Octave Chanute & Augustus Moore Herring

Hewitt
(V. V. D. Hewitt)
 Hewitt 1909 glider

Hick
(W. Eddie Hick / Newcastle Gliding Club)
 Hick Merlin

Hikari
(Fukuda Hikari)
 Fukuda Hikari Ken 2.2

Hill
( W.T. Geoffrey Hill)
 Hill 1913 glider
 Hill Pterodactyl Mk.1

Hill-Kuykendall-Smith
(Bob Kuykendall, Steve Smith, and Brad Hill)
 Hill Tetra-15

Hinkler
(Herbert John Louis "Bert" Hinkler)
 Hinkler 1912 glider

Hirth
(Wolf Hirth)
 Württemberg (glider)
 Hirth Hi 20 MoSe
 Hirth Hi 21
 Hirth Hi 25 Kria (Wolf Hirth, Hermann Nagele and Richard Eppler)
 Hirth Hi 26 MoSe II
 Hirth-Hütter Goevier III
 Hirth-Wenk-Schneider Moazagotl – (Hirth ordered, Wenk designed, Schneider built)
 Hirth Hi.II

HKS
(Entwicklungsgemeinschaft Haase-Kenche-Schmetz - Ernst-Günter Haase, Heiz Kensche & Ferdinand B. Schmetz)
 HKS-1 V1 and V2
 HKS-2
 HKS-3

HOAC Flugzeugwerk 
see:Diamond Aircraft

Hoekstra
(J.K. Hoekstra)
 Hoekstra T-20

Hofírkův
(Stanislav Hofírkův)
 Hofírkův Milan

Hoffmann
see:Diamond Aircraft

Hofmann
(Heinrich Hofmann)
 Hofmann Westpreussen

Hofmann
(H. Hofmann / Kegel-Flugzeugbau, Kassel)
 Hofmann Schloß Mainberg

Høgslund/Traugott-Olsen
(Knud Høgslund & Fritz Traugott-Olsen)
 Høgslund/Traugott-Olsen 2G

Hohmuth
(Otto Hohmuth - Berliner Segelflieger)
 Hohmuth Windhund

Holdsworth
(H. Holdsworth)
 Holdsworth 1929 glider – Holdsworth, H.
 Holdsworth 1931 glider – Holdsworth, H.

Holeka
(Rudolf Holeka)
 Holeka Míra 3

Holigaus
(Klaus & Lanaverre Holigaus)
 Lanaverre SL-2 Janus

Hollfelder
Obering. Hans Hollfelder
 Hollfelder Greif I – Hans Hollfender
 Hollfelder Greif III – Hans Hollfender
 Hollfelder Greif IV – Hans Hollfender
 Hollfelder Greif V – Hans Hollfender

Holmes
(Kenneth Holmes)
 Holmes KH-1

Holste 
(Max Holste)
 Holste MH 20-P1
 Holste PE-1

Honjo
(Kiro Honjo & Asahi Miyahara)
 Honjo K-16 Kamo
 Honjo-Miyahara Mita 2

Horten
(Walter & Reimar Horten)
 Horten H.I
 Horten H.II
 Horten H.III
 Horten H.IV
 Horten H.V
 Horten H.VI
 Horten H.VII
 Horten H.VIII
 Horten H.IX V1
 Horten H.Xa Piernífero
 Horten H.Xb Piernífero
 Horten H.Xc Piernífero
 Horten H.XII
 Horten H.XIII
 Horten Ho 1B (post war – Argentina)
 Horten Ho 1O (Piernifero)
 Horten XIV Olympia
 Horten XVa
 Horten XVb
 Horten XVc
 Horten XVI Colibri
 Horten Ho 33A
 Horten Ho 33B
 Horten Parabel
 Horten Cóndor Andino – Reimar Horten aka  I.A. 54 Cóndor Andino
 Horten-Schäfer Aachen – designed by Reimar Horten & Schäfer_ built by Christiani Wassertechnik GmbH

Hosszú-Tišma
(István Hosszú & Vladimir Tišma)
 Hosszú-Tišma 1932 triplane

HpH
(HPH ltd. Kutná Hora, Czech Republic)
 HpH 304
 HpH 304B
 HpH 304C Wasp
 HpH 304CZ
 HpH 304CZ-17
 HpH 304E Shark
 HpH 304MS Shark
 HpH 304S Shark
 HpH 304SJ Shark
 HpH 304TS Twin Shark

Hrbek
(Jan Hrbek)
 Hrbek Albatros
 Hrbek Morava I
 Hrbek Přerov

Hrisafovic
(Nenad Hrisafovic)
 Hrisafovic HS-62 Cirus
 Hrisafovic HS-64

Huber-Schmid
(Karl Huber & Ernst Schmid)
 Huber-Schmid Zaunkönig

Hug
(August Hug)
 Hug Dräckspatz II
 Hug Geier
 Hug Gimpel
 Hug Spyr I
 Hug Spyr III
 Hug Spyr III-A
 Hug Spyr IV
 Hug Spyr V
 Hug Spyr Va
 GBMZ Zögling

Hulton
(E.A.S. Hulton
 Hulton 1969 hang glider

Humek
 Humek H-2 Metla

Hunziker
(Raúl Hunziker)
 Hunziker Cimarrón

Hutchinson
(Vernon Hutchinson)
 Hutchinson HS-127

Hütter
(Wolfgang Hütter & Ulrich Hütter)
 Hütter Hü 17
 Hütter Hi-21
 Hütter HT-23 Tandemdecker
 Hütter Hü 28
 Hütter H-30
 Hütter H-30TS
 Hütter IMI
 Stekelis-Hütter 17 – Huberts Stekelis
 Vilnis-Hütter 17 – Edvins Vilnis
 Vainode Duja – A Hutter-17 type, based in Vainode. Built by the 17th Glider Aviator Group.
 Scott Hütter 17

HWL
(Tadeusz Chyliński / Harcerskie Warsztaty Lotnicze (H.W.L.), Warsaw (PO))
 HWL Pegaz

Notes

Further reading

External links

Lists of glider aircraft